The 2000 United States House of Representatives elections in Virginia were held on November 7, 2000 to determine who will represent the Commonwealth of Virginia in the United States House of Representatives. Virginia has eleven seats in the House, apportioned according to the 1990 United States Census. Representatives are elected for two-year terms.

Overview

District 1

District 2

District 3

District 4

District 5

District 6

District 7

District 8

District 9

District 10

District 11

References

See also
 2000 United States House of Representatives elections

Virginia
2000
2000 Virginia elections